Branch Creek is a locality in the North Burnett Region, Queensland, Australia.

Geography 
Branch Creek (from which the locality presumably takes its name) rises in the north-west of the locality and flows to the south of the locality where it becomes a tributary to Reid Creek (which was also known as Binjour Creek), which then continues south to Binjour.

History 
The bushranger "the Wild Scotchman" was said to have hidden out in the vicinity of Branch Creek and the adjacent Mungy Station in the mid-1860s.  The bushranger was said to have visited the Black Horse Hotel which was on the old Gayndah-Dalgangal road where it passed through Branch Creek.

Branch Creek No. 1 was one of the stations that comprised the pastoral run of Ideraway.

Fontainebleau State School opened at Branch Creek on 16 September 1915. It closed in 1964. It was on a  site on the north-eastern side of Binjour Branch Creek Road.

Education 
There are no schools in Branch Creek. The nearest government primary schools are Binjour Plateau State School in neighbouring Binjour to the south and Eidsvold State School in Eidsvold to the west. The nearest government secondary schools are Eidsvold State School (to Year 12) in Eidsvold to the west, Mundubbera State School (to Year 10) in Mundubbera to the south, and Burnett State College (to Year 12) in Gayndah to the south-east.

References

Further reading 

  — includes short history of the Binjour District, Binjour Plateau State School, Gurgeena State School, Gleneden State School, Fountainebleau State School, Norwood State School, Reid's Creek Upper State School, and Reid's Creek State School.

North Burnett Region
Localities in Queensland